Lisan al-Mizan or Lisan ul Mizan,  is one of the classic book of Ilm al-Rijal (Science of Narrators or Biographical evaluation) written by Hafiz Ibn Hajar al-Asqalani (d.852 AH) in the 9th century of Islamic History.

Description
This book is actually the rework of Imam al-Dhahabi book by the name of Mizan al-Itidal. Ibn Hijr has refined it, made this work expansive and named it as Lisan al-Mizan. It is one of the most popular book in the field of Ilm al-Rijal (Science of Narrators or Biographical evaluation) and contains more than 6000 pages.

Publications
The book has been published by many organizations around the world: 
    Lisan al-Mizan 10 Books in 4 VOLUMES (لسان الميزان) Ibn Hajar: Published:  Maktab al-Matbu'at al-Islamiyyah | Beirut, Lebanon
   Lisan al-Mizan (8 Vol) لسان الميزان by Ibn Hajar: Published:DKI, Beirut, 2010

See also
 List of Sunni books
 Kutub al-Sittah

References

9th-century Arabic books
10th-century Arabic books
Sunni literature
Hadith
Hadith collections
Sunni hadith collections